Action & Action is the second single from The Get Up Kids' album Something to Write Home About. The single was only released in Europe, and is the first Get Up Kids single released on CD on March 24, 2000 in North America and November 24 elsewhere. A music video for the song was released earlier in December 1999.

Track listing

Additional releases
"Action & Action" was also released on the band's live album Live! @ The Granada Theater.
"Close to Me" was released on the band's rarities and B-sides collection Eudora.
A special version of "I'm a Loner Dottie, a Rebel" was released on the band's rarities and B-sides collection Eudora.

Personnel
Matt Pryor - vocals, guitar
Jim Suptic - guitar, backing vocals
Rob Pope - bass
Ryan Pope - drums
James Dewees - keyboards

Notes

2000 singles
The Get Up Kids songs
1999 songs
Epitaph Records singles